In geometry, Soddy's hexlet is a chain of six spheres (shown in grey in Figure 1), each of which is tangent to both of its neighbors and also to three mutually tangent given spheres.  In Figure 1, the three spheres are the red inner sphere and two spheres (not shown) above and below the plane the centers of the hexlet spheres lie on.  In addition, the hexlet spheres are tangent to a fourth sphere (the blue outer sphere in Figure 1), which is not tangent to the three others.

According to a theorem published by Frederick Soddy in 1937, it is always possible to find a hexlet for any choice of mutually tangent spheres A, B and C.  Indeed, there is an infinite family of hexlets related by rotation and scaling of the hexlet spheres (Figure 1); in this, Soddy's hexlet is the spherical analog of a Steiner chain of six circles.  Consistent with Steiner chains, the centers of the hexlet spheres lie in a single plane, on an ellipse.  Soddy's hexlet was also discovered independently in Japan, as shown by Sangaku tablets from 1822 in Kanagawa prefecture.

Definition
Soddy's hexlet is a chain of six spheres, labeled S1–S6, each of which is tangent to three given spheres, A, B and C, that are themselves mutually tangent at three distinct points.   (For consistency throughout the article, the hexlet spheres will always be depicted in grey, spheres A and B in green, and sphere C in blue.)  The hexlet spheres are also tangent to a fourth fixed sphere D (always shown in red) that is not tangent to the three others, A, B and C.

Each sphere of Soddy's hexlet is also tangent to its neighbors in the chain; for example, sphere S4 is tangent to S3 and S5.  The chain is closed, meaning that every sphere in the chain has two tangent neighbors; in particular, the initial and final spheres, S1 and S6, are tangent to one another.

Annular hexlet

The annular Soddy's hexlet is a special case (Figure 2), in which the three mutually tangent spheres consist of a single sphere of radius r (blue) sandwiched between two parallel planes (green) separated by a perpendicular distance 2r.  In this case, Soddy's hexlet consists of six spheres of radius r packed like ball bearings around the central sphere and likewise sandwiched.  The hexlet spheres are also tangent to a fourth sphere (red), which is not tangent to the other three.

The chain of six spheres can be rotated about the central sphere without affecting their tangencies, showing that there is an infinite family of solutions for this case.   As they are rotated, the spheres of the hexlet trace out a torus (a doughnut-shaped surface); in other words, a torus is the envelope of this family of hexlets.

Solution by inversion
The general problem of finding a hexlet for three given mutually tangent spheres A, B and C can be reduced to the annular case using inversion.  This geometrical operation always transforms spheres into spheres or into planes, which may be regarded as spheres of infinite radius.  A sphere is transformed into a plane if and only if the sphere passes through the center of inversion.  An advantage of inversion is that it preserves tangency; if two spheres are tangent before the transformation, they remain so after.  Thus, if the inversion transformation is chosen judiciously, the problem can be reduced to a simpler case, such as the annular Soddy's hexlet.  Inversion is reversible; repeating an inversion in the same point returns the transformed objects to their original size and position.

Inversion in the point of tangency between spheres A and B transforms them into parallel planes, which may be denoted as a and b.  Since sphere C is tangent to both A and B and does not pass through the center of inversion, C is transformed into another sphere c that is tangent to both planes; hence, c is sandwiched between the two planes a and b.  This is the annular Soddy's hexlet (Figure 2).  Six spheres s1–s6 may be packed around c and likewise sandwiched between the bounding planes a and b.  Re-inversion restores the three original spheres, and transforms s1–s6 into a hexlet for the original problem.  In general, these hexlet spheres S1–S6 have different radii.

An infinite variety of hexlets may be generated by rotating the six balls s1–s6 in their plane by an arbitrary angle before re-inverting them.  The envelope produced by such rotations is the torus that surrounds the sphere c and is sandwiched between the two planes a and b; thus, the torus has an inner radius r and outer radius 3r.  After the re-inversion, this torus becomes a Dupin cyclide (Figure 3).

Dupin cyclide
The envelope of Soddy's hexlets is a Dupin cyclide, an inversion of the torus. Thus Soddy's construction shows that a cyclide of Dupin is the envelope of a 1-parameter family of spheres in two different ways, and each sphere in either family is tangent to two spheres in same family and three spheres in the other family. This result was probably known to Charles Dupin, who discovered the cyclides that bear his name in his 1803 dissertation under Gaspard Monge.

Relation to Steiner chains

The intersection of the hexlet with the plane of its spherical centers produces a Steiner chain of six circles.

Parabolic and hyperbolic hexlets

In any elliptic hexlet, such as the one shown at the top of the article, there are two tangent planes to the hexlet. If 's radius is one quarter of 's, each sphere will become a plane in the journey. The inverted image shows a normal elliptic hexlet, though, and in the parabolic hexlet, the point where a sphere turns into a plane is precisely when its inverted image passes through the centre of inversion. In such a hexlet there is only one tangent plane to the hexlet. The line of the centres of a parabolic hexlet is a parabola.

If  is even larger than that, a hyperbolic hexlet is formed, and now there are no tangent planes at all. Now the line of the centres is a hyperbola.

It then reverses concavity again and passes through the hole again, beginning another round trip. Now the line of centres is a degenerate hyperbola, where it has collapsed into two straight lines.

Sangaku tablets

Japanese mathematicians discovered the same hexlet over one hundred years before Soddy did. They analysed the packing problems in which circles and polygons, balls and polyhedrons come into contact and often found the relevant theorems independently before their discovery by Western mathematicians. They often published these as sangaku. The sangaku about the hexlet was made by Irisawa Shintarō Hiroatsu in the school of Uchida Itsumi, and dedicated to the Samukawa Shrine in May 1822. The original sangaku has been lost but was recorded in Uchida's book of Kokonsankan in 1832. A replica of the sangaku was made from the record and dedicated to the Hōtoku museum in the Samukawa Shrine in August, 2009.

The sangaku by Irisawa consists of three problems. The third problem relates to Soddy's hexlet: "the diameter of the outer circumscribing sphere is 30 sun. The diameters of the nucleus balls are 10 sun and 6 sun each. The diameter of one of the balls in the chain of balls is 5 sun. Then I asked for the diameters of the remaining balls. The answer is 15 sun, 10 sun, 3.75 sun, 2.5 sun and 2 + 8/11 sun."

In his answer, the method for calculating the diameters of the balls is written down and can consider it the following formulas to be given in the modern scale. If the ratios of the diameter of the outside ball to each of the nucleus balls are a1, a2, and if the ratios of the diameter to the chain balls are c1, ..., c6. we want to represent c2, ..., c6 in terms of  a1, a2, and c1. If

then,
.
Then c1 + c4 = c2 + c5 = c3 + c6.

If  r1, ..., r6 are the diameters of six balls, we get the formula:

See also

Descartes' theorem
Inversive geometry
Sangaku

Notes

References
 .
 .
 
 .
 .
 .
 .
 .

External links

 – The animation 0 of SANGAKU PROBLEM 0 shows the case which the radiuses of spheres A and B are equal each other and the centers of spheres A, B and C are on the line.  The animation 1 shows the case which the radiuses of spheres A and B are equal each other and the centers of spheres A, B and C are not on the line.  The animation 2 shows the case which the radiuses of spheres A and B are not equal each other.  The animation 3 shows the case which the centers of spheres A, B and C are on the line and the radiuses of spheres A and B are variable.
 – The third problem relates to Soddy's hexlet.
The page of Kokonsankan (1832) - Department of Mathematics, Kyoto University
The page of Kokonsankan (1832) – The left page relates to Soddy's hexlet.

Theorems in geometry
Euclidean solid geometry